Bertram Dillon Steele FRS (30 May 1870 – 12 April 1934) was an Australian scientist, foundation professor of chemistry at the University of Queensland .

Early life
Steele was born in Plymouth, England, the son of Samuel Madden Steele, a surgeon, and his wife Hariette Sarah, née Acock. Steele was educated at the Plymouth Grammar School; he then began an apprenticeship with his father.  Steele migrated to Australia in 1889, where he qualified as a pharmaceutical chemist at the Victorian College of Pharmacy where he won a Gold Medal in 1890. He then practised as a pharmacist.

Scientific career
Steele enrolled in medicine before transferring to the science course at the University of Melbourne in 1896, being then nearly 26 years of age, and did such distinguished work that when still only a second year student he was appointed tutorial lecturer in chemistry at the three affiliated colleges, Trinity, Ormond and Queen's. Steele graduated BSc in 1898 with first-class honours in chemistry, having during his course won exhibitions in chemistry, natural philosophy and biology, and the Wyselaskie and university scholarships in chemistry. In 1899 Steele was appointed acting-professor of chemistry at the University of Adelaide, married Amy Woodhead of Melbourne, and at the end of that year went to Europe with an 1851 scholarship.

Steele worked with Professor J. Norman Collie at London and did research work under Professor Abegg at Breslau, Germany. Returning to London he did research work with Sir William Ramsay, and then went to Canada and became a senior demonstrator in chemistry at McGill University, Montreal. The University of Melbourne granted him a D.Sc. in absentia, in 1902. Steele returned to Europe to become assistant professor of chemistry at the Heriot-Watt College, Edinburgh.

In 1905 Steele was appointed senior lecturer and demonstrator in chemistry at the University of Melbourne. While in this position Steele, working in conjunction with Kerr Grant (who later became professor of Physics at the University of Adelaide), constructed a micro-balance that was sensitive to 4 nanograms. An account of this balance written by Steele and Grant was published in Vol. 82A of the Proceedings of the Royal Society of London in 1909. As a result of their work the remarkable researches of Dr Whytlaw Gray and Sir William Ramsay on the direct estimation of the density of the Radium emanation was made possible.

On 20 December 1910 Steele was appointed professor of chemistry at the newly established University of Queensland. He was elected president of the board of faculties and his experience was of great use in setting the university on its course. Steele's academic work was interrupted by World War I; from June 1915 he was working for the Ministry of Munitions, London. Steele had a new type of gas mask which he had invented, and an invention to be used against submarines, both of which were presented to the British government. While working for the government he was able to show that synthetic phenol could be produced for less than half the price then being paid for it. He worked out an entirely new process, and designed and had erected a large government factory for its production. While working for the government he refused an offer to go to America at £5000 a year and when it was suggested that an honour might be conferred courteously intimated that he was glad to work for his country without either additional salary or honours. Later on he did important work for the government in connection with poison gases.

On leaving England at the end of the war Steele received letters of thanks from Mr Winston Churchill and Lord Moulton for the great services he had rendered. He took up his university work again in 1919 and in that year was elected a Fellow of the Royal Society, London.

Later life

Steele had overworked during the war and his constitution never fully recovered from the strain. He resigned his chair in 1931 and lived in retirement at Brisbane until his death. His wife would survive him. They had no children.

Steele was a man of medium height with a frank and open countenance, with an unselfish outlook on life, and a personality that attracted both his students and his associate workers. He was a tireless worker and an ideal researcher – honest, patient, imaginative and cautious. Circumstances prevented him doing a large amount of original work, but much of the work he did during the war years was of a secret nature, the value of which cannot be estimated. Earlier in his career he did research in connection with the determination of transport numbers of electrolytes and the electrochemistry of non-aqueous solutions. The heavy workload of organising and carrying on a new department at the University of Queensland left him little time for research, but as chairman of the Royal Commission for the control of prickly pear he was associated with the successful solution of a problem which was a great danger to Queensland.

Legacy 
A major building fronting the Great Court of the University of Queensland is named for him. An annual lecture is given in his name at the University, since 1982.

References

Further reading
 – available online

External links 

1870 births
1934 deaths
Scientists from Plymouth, Devon
Australian chemists
Academic staff of the University of Queensland
Fellows of the Royal Society
British emigrants to Australia